Hamilton-Mehta Productions is a Toronto-based independent film production company. Founded in 1996 by director Deepa Mehta and producer David Hamilton, Hamilton-Mehta Productions is well known for its films that explore the human condition. The recipient of many well respected awards, Hamilton-Mehta's film Water was nominated in 2007 for an Academy Award for Best Foreign Language Film.

Filmography
Fire (1996)
Earth (1998)
Water (2005)
Heaven on Earth (2008)
The Forgotten Woman (2008) 
Cooking with Stella (2009)Midnight's Children (2012) - based on the novel Midnight's Children by Salman RushdieBeeba Boys (2015)Anatomy of Violence'' (2016)

References

External links

1996 establishments in Ontario
Canadian companies established in 1996
Canadian independent film studios
Companies based in Toronto
Film production companies of Canada
Mass media companies established in 1996